Musab Kheder (born 26 September 1993) is a professional footballer who plays for Al-Sadd. Born in Sudan, he represents the Qatar national team.

Honours

Club
Al-Sadd
Qatar Stars League: 2012-13, 2020-21, 2021-22
Emir of Qatar Cup: 2014, 2015, 2020, 2021
Qatar Cup: 2021
Sheikh Jassim Cup: 2014, 2017
Qatari Stars Cup: 2019-20

References

External links
 

1993 births
Living people
Qatari footballers
Al Sadd SC players
Al-Rayyan SC players
Al-Arabi SC (Qatar) players
Qatari people of Sudanese descent
Sudanese emigrants to Qatar
Naturalised citizens of Qatar
Qatar Stars League players
Association football fullbacks
2021 CONCACAF Gold Cup players
2022 FIFA World Cup players